The 2012–13 TCU Horned Frogs basketball team represented Texas Christian University in the 2012–13 NCAA Division I men's basketball season. This was head coach Trent Johnson's first season at TCU. They played their home games at Daniel–Meyer Coliseum in Fort Worth, Texas and were in their first season as members of the Big 12 Conference. They finished the season 11–21, 2–16 in Big 12 play to finish in last place. They lost in the first round of the Big 12 tournament to Texas. On February 8, 2013, TCU earned their first ever Big 12 conference victory with a 62–55 upset win over 5th ranked Kansas. The win was also TCU's first over an opponent ranked in the top 5.

Before the Season

Departures

Recruits

Roster

Schedule and results 

|-
!colspan=9| Regular season

|-
!colspan=9| 2013 Big 12 men's basketball tournament
|-

References 

Tcu
TCU Horned Frogs men's basketball seasons